Captain John Hart may refer to:
Captain John Hart (Torchwood), fictional character on Torchwood TV Series
John Hart (South Australian colonist) (1809–1873), sailor, businessman, and premier of South Australia